Brønnum House (Danish: Brønnums Hus) is a listed building located next to the Royal Danish Theatre on Kongens Nytorv in central Copenhagen, Denmark. It was one of the first buildings that was completed in connection with the redevelopment of the former Gammelholm naval dockyards. The building is now owned by Karberghus. It has been converted into serviced offices and the ground floor is home to a high-end cocktail bar.

History

Brønnum House was the first residential building to be completed when the former naval dockyards at Gammelholm came under redevelopment in the 1860s. It was designed by Ferdinand Wilhelm Jensen and built 1865-1866. The building was purchased by the broker Martin Henriques and the tobacco manufacturer Bernhard Hirschsprung who both lived in the building with their families for many years.

 
Henriques and his wife Terese (née Abrahamson) lived on the first floor until their deaths in 1912 and 1882. The couple were close friends of the writer Hans Christian Andersen to whom they had been introduced by ballet master August Bournonville. Martin R Henriques' sister Dorothea Melchior (1823-1885) and her husband Moritz G. Melchior were also among Andersen's closest friends. Other prominent cultural figures visited their home, including August Bournonville and the composers Niels W. Gade, J. P. E. Hartmann and Edvard Grieg.

Hirschsprung lived with his family on the second floor. Together with his brother, Heinrich Hirschsprung, Bernhard Hirschsprung had taken over his father's tobacco company A.M. Hirschsprung & Sønner in 1959. In 1870, the company completed a new factory a little down the street, on the corner of Tordenskjoldsgade and Geibergsgade.

For more than 125 years, the ground floor contained Café Brønnum, an establishment popular with actors from the Royal Theatre as well as other artists. The premises later contained the ticket office of the theatre.

Architecture

The building is four storeys high and consists of four bays on Tordenskjoldsgade, a three-bay rounded corner and a half bay that connects the building to Harsdorff's House on Kongens Nytorv. The building surrounds three sides of a small courtyard which is closed to the south by a fire wall.

The external façade has rustication on the ground floor and rich stucco decorations on the upper floors. The keystones of the rounded openings are designed as grotesque masques. Other decorations include dolphins below the windows on the first floor and shields crowned by hives and held by mermaids above the windows on the first floor and eagles above the windows on the second floor. The iron balconies on the rounded corner of the first and second floor are supported by flying eagles. Below the rain gutters is a frieze featuring putti holding a garland. A falling putto is seen in the bay furthest to the east. The figure was made to commemorate a worker who fell to his death under the construction of the building.

The apartment on the second floor features murals with scenes from Hirschsprung's country house painted by Niss (1842-1905) and Gotfred Rump (1816–80). The living room features the original leather wallpaper with gilded detailing.

Today
In 2014, Brønnum House was acquired by Karberghus and put through a major renovation. The building now houses a high-end office hotel (office club) with 140 workplaces on 4 floors. The offices are fully service. A cocktail bar opened on the ground floor in August 2016.

In popular culture
The Brønnum House is used as a location in the 1975 Danish comedy film Familien Gyldenkål.

See also
 Søtorvet, Copenhagen
 Lihme House
 Moses Melchior
 List of streets in Copenhagen

References

External links

 Brønnums Hus Office Club
 Karberghus
 H. C. Andersen's letters to Therese and Martin R. Henriques 1860-75
 Source
 Source

Apartment buildings in Copenhagen
Historicist architecture in Copenhagen
Residential buildings completed in 1866
1866 establishments in Denmark
Gammelholm